Bilska Parish is an administrative territorial entity of Smiltene Municipality, Latvia.

Painter Rūdolfs Pērle was born in Bilska Parish.

References 

Parishes of Latvia
Smiltene Municipality